Farm to Market Road 973 (FM 973) is a farm-to-market road in Travis and Williamson counties in the U.S. state of Texas.

Route description
FM 973 begins at  US 183 southeast of Austin, near Mustang Ridge. The route travels generally to the northeast and enters Austin, where it intersects SH 71 near Austin–Bergstrom International Airport. It continues to skirt the eastern city limits of Austin, crossing the  SH 130 toll road before entering Manor, where it intersects  US 290. FM 973 continues north into Williamson County before reaching its northern terminus at  US 79 in Taylor.

The segment of FM 973 between US 183 and SH 71 is designated a scenic roadway by the City of Austin.

History
FM 973 was first designated in Williamson County on November 23, 1948; its original routing was from  SH 95 north of Coupland to the Travis County line. It was extended southward into Travis County on May 23, 1951, to an intersection with the former  SH 20 (present-day US 290) in Manor, replacing FM 1326. On January 21, 1956, the route was extended northward to SH 95 in Taylor, and the eastern leg from Rice's Crossing to SH 95 was redesignated as  FM 1660, but was not effective until the 1957 travel map was released. On October 31, 1957, a southern extension from Manor to SH 71 was added. The section from Loop 212 to FM 969 was formerly proposed as FM 2332. Two further extensions, to  FM 812 on September 20, 1961 and US 183 on June 12, 1968, brought the route's southern terminus to its current location. In 1987, the northern terminus in Taylor was shifted to a point along US 79; this change took effect in 1992, when the new alignment was opened to traffic. On June 29, 2010, FM 973 was rerouted, with the old route given to the county.

In 2017, TxDOT began studying the possibility of rerouting and expanding FM 973 to bypass downtown Manor and eliminate its concurrency with US 290. , the preferred alignment has been identified, but funding has not yet been secured.

Major intersections

Notes

References

0973
Transportation in Travis County, Texas
Transportation in Williamson County, Texas